Cilo–Aufina was a Swiss professional cycling team that existed from 1978 to 1986. Its main sponsor was Swiss bicycle manufacturer Cilo.

References

Cycling teams based in Switzerland
Defunct cycling teams based in Switzerland
1978 establishments in Switzerland
1986 disestablishments in Switzerland
Cycling teams established in 1978
Cycling teams disestablished in 1986